The Frumpies were an American lo-fi punk rock band formed in 1992 in Olympia, Washington, United States. The original line-up consisted of singers/guitarists Tobi Vail, Kathi Wilcox, and Billy Karren (all of whom were also a part of the legendary riot grrrl band Bikini Kill), and Bratmobile drummer Molly Neuman. Their debut was the 7-inch single Alien Summer Nights on the Chainsaw Records label. Babies and Bunnies was recorded in 1993, with future Make-Up and Weird War bassist Michelle Mae signing on long enough to record "Tommy Slich." 

After a two-year hiatus, the Frumpies reunited in 1996, releasing the EP Eunuch Nights. The CD collection Frumpie One Piece assembled all of the band's previous singles. The group's last release was the 2000 EP "Frumpies Forever."

Discography
Alien Summer Nights (7" EP) CHSW 6, released 1993.
Babies & Bunnies (7" EP) KRS213, released 1993-08.
Tommy Slich  (7", EP) Lookout 091, released 1993.
Safety First  (7", EP) WIJ31V, released 1994.
Eunuch Nights (7" EP) KRS322, released: 1998-09-23.
Frumpie One-Piece (CD) KRS335, released: 1998-10-23.
Frumpies Forever (7" EP) KRS366, released: 2000-08-01.

References

Punk rock groups from Washington (state)
Musical groups from Olympia, Washington
Riot grrrl bands
Garage punk groups